Kathy Daughn is a cutting horse trainer who has won over $4.25 Million in cutting horse competition. She is an honoree in the NCHA Rider Hall of Fame and National Cowgirl Hall of Fame, and the first woman to win two NCHA Futurity Open Division Championship titles (1985 and 2000). Daughn rode The Gemnist (Doc Bar Gem x Miss Fancy Zan by Black Gold Zan) to win the 1985 NCHA Futurity, marking an event-record score of 229. After of span of 15 years, she rode Royal Fletch (Jae Bar Fletch x Royal Blue Dually by Dual Pep)  to win the 2000 NCHA Futurity.

Early history
Daughn was raised in San Francisco, CA in a non-horse owning family. As a teenager, she rode hunter-jumpers in Golden Gate Park, and it was not long before she set her sights on cutting horses. Daughn moved to Texas in 1980, and worked for cutting horse trainer Larry Reeder for 3½ years. She left Reeder and worked for a year with her mentor, cutting horse trainer Lindy Burch, and then set out on her own.

Notes

References

Living people
American female horse trainers
NCHA Hall of Fame (riders)
Cowgirl Hall of Fame inductees
1959 births
Cutting (sport)
American female equestrians
21st-century American women